Zachary Tinkle (born July 3, 2002) is an American professional stock car racing driver. He competes full-time in the ARCA Menards Series East, and part-time in the ARCA Menards Series, driving the No. 11 Toyota Camry for Fast Track Racing.

Racing career

Early racing career 
Tinkle would first start racing go karts and mini cup cars in the mid 2010s. In 2014, he would win the Rookie of the Year award in the Central States Region Super Cups. He would then win the series championship in 2017.

Tinkle won the Rockford Speedway MiniCup division championship in 2016. 

In 2018, Tinkle moved to the Vore’s Welding CRA Late Model Sportsman championship, and placed 5th in the championship.

In 2019, he would return to the Vore’s Welding CRA Late Model Sportsman championship, and would score 2 wins en route to the series championship, he would also win the 2019 CRA Late Model Sportsman Triple Crown and the 2019 Anderson Speedway McGunegill Engines Late Model Series championship. He is the first driver to have won all three in the same year.

In 2020, Tinkle would run Part-Time in the JEG'S / CRA All-Stars Tour and would place 7th in the championship. He would Again compete Part-Time in 2021. He would also partake in Speedweeks at New Smyrna Speedway in the Pro Late Model division, Where he would score 1 fastest qualifier and place 7th in points.

In 2021, his racing career would come to a halt when his father, Brad Tinkle, had a stroke. Tinkle would start a GoFundMe in order to restart his racing career.

ARCA Menards Series 
Tinkle would announce that he had signed for one race with Wayne Peterson Racing on July 15, 2021 after Peterson needed a driver for the race. Peterson was impressed with Tinkle's performance, and would him sign him for three more races that year.

After Tim Richmond was injured at the 2021 Henry Ford Health System 200, Tinkle was announced to replace Richmond for the last four races of the season.

He would return to Wayne Peterson Racing for a majority of the schedule in 2022.

ARCA Menards Series East 
Tinkle was scheduled make his debut in the 2021 Pensacola 200 in the 2021 ARCA Menards Series East season, driving the No. 22 for Brandon Oakley Racing. However, the team would withdraw. He would instead make his debut in the 2021 Bush's Beans 200 for Richmond Clubb Motorsports.

On December 6, 2022, Tinkle announced that he will run full-time in the East Series in 2023, driving the No. 11 car for Fast Track Racing.

Motorsports career results

ARCA Menards Series 
(key) (Bold – Pole position awarded by qualifying time. Italics – Pole position earned by points standings or practice time. * – Most laps led.)

ARCA Menards Series East

ARCA Menards Series West 
(key) (Bold – Pole position awarded by qualifying time. Italics – Pole position earned by points standings or practice time. * – Most laps led.)

References

External links 
 Zachary Tinkle driver statistics at Racing-Reference
 Zachary Tinkle's official website

2002 births
Living people
ARCA Menards Series drivers
NASCAR drivers
Racing drivers from Indiana
Racing drivers from Indianapolis